Juan Prieto may refer to:

Juan Antonio Espinoza Prieto, (1926-2011), Chilean actor 
Juan António Prieto (fl. 1992–2000), Spanish paralympic runner
Juan Carlos Prieto (fl. 1992), Spanish paralympic high jumper

See also
Antonio Prieto (disambiguation)